Columbu is an Italian surname. Notable people with the surname include:

Franco Columbu (1941–2019), Italian actor, author, and bodybuilder
Michele Columbu (1914–2012), Italian politician and writer 

Italian-language surnames